The following is a timeline of the history of the municipality of Delft, Netherlands.

Prior to 18th century

 1075 - Town established by Godfrey III, Duke of Lower Lorraine.
 1246 - Delft granted city rights by William II of Holland.
 1250 - St. Bartholomew's Church construction begins.
 1383 - Nieuwe Kerk (Delft) (church) construction begins.
 1389 - Canal to the Meuse river created.
 1400 - Eastern Gate (Delft) built.
 1403 - Agathaklooster (convent) established.
 1470 - Carthusian monastery established.
 1477 - Printing press in operation; Delft Bible issued.
 1536 - 3 May: .
 1575 - Museum Het Prinsenhof converted into a residence for the counts of Orange.
 1583 - Birth of Hugo Grotius, philosopher, political theorist and poet.
 1584 - William I, Prince of Orange assassinated in Museum Het Prinsenhof.
 1586 - Scientists Simon Stevin and Jan Cornets de Groot conduct a landmark experiment on the effects of gravity from the roof of the Nieuwe Kerk.
 1611 - Guild of Saint Luke founded (approximate date).
 1618 - City Hall (Delft) rebuilt.
 1621 - Bank of Delft established.
 1632 - Future scientist Antonie van Leeuwenhoek and future artist Johannes Vermeer born in Delft.
 1647 - Production of Delft pottery begins to expand.
 1652 - Fabritius paints A View of Delft artwork.
 1653 - Royal Delft porcelain factory begins operating.
 1654 - 12 October: .
 1661 - Vermeer paints View of Delft artwork.
 1692 - Armamentarium built.

18th-19th centuries
 1721 - Delftsche Courant newspaper begins publication.
 1769 - Stadsleenbank Delft (bank) built (approximate date).
 1842 -  (engineering school) established.
 1859 - Delft City Archive active.
 1866 - Population: 21,877.
 1882 -  (church) built.
 1884 - Agnetapark workers' housing developed.
 1886
  (church) built.
 1895 -  built.
 1900 - Population: 31,582.

20th century

 1905 - Delft Institute of Technology active.
 1911 - Museum Het Prinsenhof active.
 1919 - Population: 38,433.
 1920 -  becomes mayor.
 1921 - Hof van Delft and Vrijenban become part of Delft.
 1970 - Roadway speed bump installed.
 1976 - Tanthof development begins.
 1977 - City Statistisch Jaarboek (yearbook) begins publication.

21st century

 2004 -  becomes mayor.
 2007 -  (library) built.
 2015 - Delft railway station rebuilt.
 2016
 Marja van Bijsterveldt becomes mayor.
 Population: 101,053.

See also
 
 
 
 History of the County of Holland
 Timelines of other municipalities in the Netherlands: Amsterdam, Breda, Eindhoven, Groningen, Haarlem, The Hague, 's-Hertogenbosch, Leiden, Maastricht, Nijmegen, Rotterdam, Utrecht

References

This article incorporates information from the Dutch Wikipedia.

Bibliography

in English
 
 

 

 
 ( 1881 ed.)
 
 

in Dutch
 D. E. van Bleyswyck. Beschryvinge der stadt Delft (Delft, 1667)
 R. Boitet. Beschryving der stadt Delft (Delft, 1729)
 
 P. Beydals. Kroniek der stad Delft (The Hague, 1936)
 
 I. V. T. Spaander and R.-A. Leeuw, eds. De Stad Delft: Cultur en maatschappij (Delft, 1979–82) (3 vols.)

External links

 Items related to Delft, various dates (via Europeana)
 Items related to Delft, various dates (via Digital Public Library of America)

 
Delft
Years in the Netherlands